"Une vie d'amour" (A life of love) is a song written by Charles Aznavour to the music of Georges Garvarentz. The Russian lyrics of the song were written by Natalia Konchalovsky.

History
The original version, sung by Aznavour in French, was introduced in the 1981 movie Teheran 43 (USSR). In March the same year it was by released by French Barclay Records in three separate albums - Teheran 43, Autobiographie and Une vie d'amour single with Mireille Mathieu.

The song, whose title can be loosely translated as "A Life in Love", is a slow love ballad. There is also alternative Russian translation (by Alexander Solin) and a Chinese version of the song.

Other recordings
Duet by Charles Aznavour and Mireille Mathieu
Duet by Filipp Kirkorov and Alsou
Duet by Avraam Russo and Oksana Lepska
Duet by Lev Leshchenko and Tamara Gverdwiteli
Lyudmila Gurchenko
Demis Roussos
Alexey Vorobyov
Duet by Larisa Dolina and Garik Martirosyan
Valery Leontyev
Oleg Pogudin
Pavlo Tabakov - the song was partially translated into Ukrainian by Mariana Savka

References

Charles Aznavour songs
Demis Roussos songs
Valery Leontiev songs
1981 songs
Male–female vocal duets
Songs written by Charles Aznavour
Songs with music by Georges Garvarentz